Omoglymmius caelatus is a species of beetle in the subfamily Rhysodidae. It was described by R.T. & J.R. Bell in 1981.

References

caelatus
Beetles described in 1981